Brachypanorpa is a genus of scorpionflies in the family Panorpodidae. There are about five described species in Brachypanorpa.

Species
These five species belong to the genus Brachypanorpa:
 Brachypanorpa carolinensis (Banks, 1905) (short-nosed scorpionfly)
 Brachypanorpa jeffersoni Byers, 1976
 Brachypanorpa montana Carpenter, 1931
 Brachypanorpa oregonensis (MacLachlan, 1881)
 Brachypanorpa sacajawea Byers, 1990

References

Further reading

 
 
 

Mecoptera
Articles created by Qbugbot